Hang Dong is a district (amphoe) of Chiang Mai province in northern Thailand.

Geography
Neighboring districts are (from the southwest clockwise) San Pa Tong, Mae Wang, Samoeng, Mae Rim, Mueang Chiang Mai, Saraphi of Chiang Mai Province, and Mueang Lamphun of Lamphun province.

The village Ban Tawai (บ้านถวาย) in Khun Khong sub-district is known for its handicraft center, as wood carving has been a local speciality since the 1960s.

History
Before 1917, the district was named Mae Tha Chang (แม่ท่าช้าง). 1938 the district was downgraded to a minor district (king amphoe) and made subordinate to Mueang Chiang Mai District. In 1947 it was elevated to full district status again.

Administration

Central administration 
Hang Dong is divided into 11 sub-districts (tambons), which are further subdivided into 109 administrative villages (muban).

Local administration 
There are 10 sub-district municipalities (thesaban tambons) in the district:
 Nong Tong Phatthana consisting of sub-district Nong Tong.
 Hang Dong consisting of parts of sub-district Hang Dong.
 Mae Tha Chang consisting of parts of sub-district Hang Dong.
 Nong Kaeo consisting of sub-district Nong Kaeo.
 Han Kaeo consisting of sub-district Han Kaeo.
 Ban Waen consisting of sub-district Ban Waen.
 San Phak Wan consisting of sub-district San Phak Wan.
 Nong Khwai consisting of sub-district Nong Khwai.
 Ban Pong consisting of sub-district Ban Pong.
 Nam Phrae Phatthana consisting of sub-district Nam Phrae.

There are two sub-district administrative organizations (SAO) in the district:
 Khun Khong consisting of sub-district Khun Khong.
 Sop Mae Kha consisting of sub-district Sop Mae Kha.

Gallery

Further reading
 "Wat Ton Kwen and Wat Hang Dong: Two Hidden Gems of Lan Na Architecture", in Forbes, Andrew, and Henley, David, Ancient Chiang Mai v 4. Chiang Mai, Cognoscenti Books, 2012. ASIN: B006J541LE

References

External links

amphoe.com

Hang Dong